Navigobius dewa is a species of dartfish native to the western Pacific Ocean where it is only known from the waters around southern Japan. This species grows to a length of  SL.

References

Microdesmidae
Gobiidae
Fish described in 2009